was the first private railway company in the history of Japan. The company built trunk lines connecting Tokyo with the Tōhoku region to the northeast. Most of its lines came under the control of Japanese Government Railways following nationalization in 1906, and many are now operated by East Japan Railway Company.

Outline
The company was incorporated in 1881 as the first privately funded railway company in Japan, where the railways had been built only by the imperial government since early 1870s. If, however, the definition of "railway" includes horsecars, Nippon Railway is behind Tokyo Bashatetsudō, established in 1880 as the first private railway in Japan.

Major investors to the company were kazoku, led by the highest-class court noble Iwakura Tomomi. The company, incorporated to help expansion of national railway network in line with the national policy, received strong support from the government, both technically and financially.

The first  of the railway, between Ueno Station in Tokyo and Kumagaya Station in Kumagaya, Saitama, opened on July 28, 1883. The mainline to Aomori was completed in 1891.

The company expanded the railway by means of both construction and acquisition of other companies. As of 1906, it operated  of railways including the present-day Tōhoku Main Line, Jōban Line, Takasaki Line and Yamanote Line.

On November 1, 1906, the entire operation of the company was purchased by the government of Japan under the Railway Nationalization Act. Consequently, the company was dissolved.

List of lines

Rolling stock

Notes

References

Defunct railway companies of Japan
Railway companies established in 1881
Railway companies disestablished in 1906
1881 establishments in Japan